La Plata High School is part of the Charles County Public Schools and is located in La Plata, Maryland, United States.  The current school was built in 1979.  Before that, it was in the building (built in 1964) which now holds Milton M. Somers Middle School.

History
On November 9, 1926, the La Plata Elementary School was destroyed by a tornado that killed 13 students. That two room building was replaced by a new school that housed both an elementary and high school for La Plata.

Demographics 
As of 2010, La Plata High School has an enrollment of 1,396 students with a demographic profile of 73.6% White, 22.6% Black, 1.7% Asian or Pacific Islander 1.5% Hispanic, and 0.7% American Indian. The Schoolwide Reading Proficiency is 85.8%, while the Schoolwide Math Proficiency is 91.9%.

Notable alumni
Matt Dyson, American football coach and a former player
William Daniel Mayer, former member of Maryland House of Delegates
Don Money, baseball player
Paul Thomas, Joel Madden and Benji Madden are members of the band Good Charlotte.
Daryl Thompson, baseball player
Zuberi Williams, judge

References 

Public high schools in Maryland
Schools in Charles County, Maryland
School buildings completed in 1979
1979 establishments in Maryland
Educational institutions established in 1979